The Bland Oak, or Bland's Oak Tree, is a historic Southern live oak situated in Greater Western Sydney, New South Wales, Australia, that is approximately over 170 years old, making it one of Sydney's oldest living introduced trees and also one of the largest in the region. A local significance and a historic symbol of Fairfield City Council, the oak tree is included on Fairfield City's coat of arms.

Description
Planted by former convict, politician, farmer and inventor William Bland in 1842, the Bland Oak was the largest tree in Australia until it split in two parts after a storm early on New Year Day 1941. Its dissipated wood was assembled and carved into the Mayoral chair, which is currently housed at Fairfield City Museum & Gallery in Smithfield. Despite the incident, the oak tree still remains to be the largest of its kind in Sydney, with its interminably sprawling crowns and prominent canopy, providing decent shade.

Significance
Fairfield mayor Frank Carbone proposed for the tree to be recognised on a national level after the council accepted its local importance in the Local Environmental Plan in 2013. Fairfield Council will apply to the National Trust of Australia to have the tree listed on the National Register of Significant Trees. According to Carbone, “This lonely tree standing in the middle of our city is significant for its age, rarity and unique shape telling a story of our heritage”. Further, he stated “It represents a significant part of our local heritage and is a historic symbol of our city, standing as a landmark beside Prospect Creek”.

Acorns from the tree were collected in March 2020 and planted to grow about 10 new "Bland Oaks" throughout the city.

Gallery

See also
Site of Ficus superba var. henneana tree, a historical tree in Sydney CBD
List of individual trees
Fairfield Park Precinct, a large park just to the north of the tree

External links
 Oakdene House Foundation
 Fairfield mayor Frank Carbone speaking about the tree in situ

References

Individual oak trees
Tourist attractions in Sydney
Individual trees in New South Wales